Lake Schmon is a lake in Quebec, Canada.

Location

Lake Schmon is in the unorganized territory of Lac-Walker, Sept-Rivières Regional County Municipality, Quebec.
As of November 2021 the Commission de toponymie of Quebec had not determined the origin or meaning of the name.
The Schmon River, which flows through the lake, is named after Arthur A. Schmon (1895-1964), president and general manager of the Quebec North Shore Paper Company.
Lake Arthur is also named after Schmon.

Hydrology

The lake is southeast of the Lac aux Chiens.
It has two roughly equal sections joined by a channel. 
The Schmon River enters the northern section from the northwest, and leaves the southern section from the southeast.

Notes

Sources

Lakes of Côte-Nord